Elizabeth Rice Achtemeier (June 11, 1926 – October 25, 2002) was an American ordained Presbyterian minister, Bible professor, and author.

Early life and education
Born Elizabeth Rice on June 11, 1926 in Bartlesville, Oklahoma, Achtemeier was raised in the Presbyterian Church (USA), in which her grandfather had been a minister. She had three older brothers. She completed undergraduate studies at Stanford University and studied at Union Theological Seminary in New York from 1948 until 1951. In the summer of 1950, she was an associate pastor and preacher for a Congregational Church in rural New Hampshire. She did postgraduate work at Heidelberg University in Germany and Basel University in Switzerland and completed her PhD at Columbia University under James Muilenburg in 1959.

Career
Achtemeier began teaching the Old Testament at Lancaster Theological Seminary while completing her PhD, teaching there until 1973. In 1973, her husband joined the all-male faculty of Union Theological Seminary as Professor of New Testament, and Achtemeier was offered an appointment as visiting, later adjunct, professor of Old Testament and visiting professor of homiletics, which she held until 1996. She was also a visiting professor at Gettysburg Lutheran Seminary, Pittsburgh Theological Seminary and Duke Divinity School.

Achtemeier was an ordained Presbyterian minister and a "nationally known preacher." She served on the denomination's Theological Task Force on Peace, Unity and Purity. Often the first or lone female in various roles she took on, she identified as an evangelical and spoke against what she called "radical feminism." She spoke and wrote against the ordination of homosexual ministers and against the church adopting female language for God.

Achtemeier wrote more than twenty books, as well as numerous articles, the majority focusing on the Old Testament and its use in Christian preaching. Her first book, co-authored with her husband, The Old Testament Roots of Our Faith was published in 1962. Her most well known book, The Old Testament and the Proclamation of the Gospel was published in 1973. She also wrote on marriage, family, sexuality, abortion and environmental issues. She preached and taught at numerous churches and university chapels across the United States and Canada. In 1999, she published an autobiography, Not Til I Have Done.

Personal life
Achtemeier met Paul J. Achtemeier at seminary and they married in June 1952. They had two children and coauthored several books and articles. Their son, Mark, teaches systematic theology at Dubuque Theological Seminary. Achtemeier died on October 25, 2002 after a long illness.

Publications

Books

Articles

References

External links
 "What We Were Meant to Be", Elizabeth Achtemeier, Duke University Chapel, March 6, 1994

1926 births
2002 deaths
People from Bartlesville, Oklahoma
Stanford University alumni
Columbia University alumni
American biblical scholars
Female biblical scholars
Bible commentators
Union Presbyterian Seminary faculty
Union Presbyterian Seminary alumni
American women academics
Women Christian clergy
20th-century Christian biblical scholars
Calvinist and Reformed biblical scholars
20th-century American women